Cha-249 or No. 249 (Japanese: 第二百四十九號驅潜特務艇) was a No.1-class auxiliary submarine chaser of the Imperial Japanese Navy that served during World War II.

History
She was laid down on 18 May 1944 at the Matsue shipyard of Fukushima Shipbuilding Co., Ltd. (有限會社福島造船鐵工所) and launched on 8 September 1944. She was fitted with armaments at the Kure Naval Arsenal; completed and commissioned on 14 November 1944; and assigned to the Zhenhai Guard Force. On 15 June 1945, she was assigned to the Sasebo Guard Force. She survived the war. On 20 December 1945, she was demobilized and assigned to mine-sweeping duties. 

On 1 January 1948, she was assigned to the Japan Maritime Safety Agency as a minesweeper and designated MS-06 on 1 May 1948. On 1 December 1951, she was renamed Kamozuru (かもづる) and served during the Korean War. On 1 September 1954, she was transferred to the newly created Japan Maritime Self-Defense Force. She was delisted on 31 March 1962.

References

1944 ships
No.1-class auxiliary submarine chasers
Auxiliary ships of the Imperial Japanese Navy